The Market Church (meaning 'church at the market place') is the main Lutheran church in Hanover, Germany. Built in the 14th century, it was referred to in 1342 as the church of Saints James and George in dedication to Saint James the Elder and Saint George. Replacing an older, smaller, church at the same location that dated to 1125 and that is known to have been called  (after Saint George) in 1238, Hanover grew around it and the market place situated immediately adjacent to its south that was established around the same time. Today the official name of the church is Market Church of Saints George and James, and along with the nearby Old Town Hall is considered the southernmost example of the northern German brick gothic architectural style.

A hall church with a monumental saddleback roof that rises above the nave and two aisles, the roof and the vaults of the naves were restored in 1952 after being destroyed in an air raid in 1943. Its tower, situated on its western side and a symbol of the power and wealth of the citizens of the town when built, is both a landmark of Hanover and,  years after its roof was first constructed, one of the highest towers in Lower Saxony.

Altar 
The main altar was carved of linden wood around 1480. Its front depicts the Passion of Christ in 21 scenes following models of Martin Schongauer, while its back shows scenes from the lives of the two patron saints, Saint George and Saint James. It was returned to the Market Church in 1952.

Organ 
An organ was installed in the tower room in 1893, which included parts of an instrument of the 17th century. This organ was destroyed in World War II.

Today's main organ is at the back wall of the southern aisle. The first instrument in that location was built in 1953 and 1954 by the organ builders  and Rudolf von Beckerath. It had 61 stops, four manuals and pedal. The casing was designed  by Dieter Oesterlen and is a protected monument.

From 2007 to 2009, the instrument was rebuilt by Orgelbau Goll in Lucerne. The casing and about half of the pipes were kept. The new organ has 64 stops, 39 of them mostly using the older material.

Bells 
The Market Church has 11 bells. The Bell of Christ and Peace is the biggest in Lower Saxony and is used on special occasions only.

References

External links 

 Marktkirche at MyTravelGuide
 Kurze Kirchengeschichte der Altstadt – short history of the churches in the Old Town, kirche-hannover.de 

Hanover
Hanover
Markt
Hanover
Hanover, Market
Tourist attractions in Hanover